Lord George Henry Cavendish (19 August 1810 – 23 September 1880) was a British nobleman and politician.

Early life
Lord George was born on 19 August 1810. He was the second son of Hon. William Cavendish and Louisa O'Callaghan. He was known as George Henry Cavendish until 1858, when his brother succeeded as Duke of Devonshire and he was given precedence as the son of a duke by Royal Warrant of Precedence.

His paternal grandparents were George Cavendish, 1st Earl of Burlington (a younger son of William Cavendish, 4th Duke of Devonshire) and Lady Elizabeth Compton (a daughter of Charles Compton, 7th Earl of Northampton). His maternal grandparents were Cornelius O'Callaghan, 1st Baron Lismore and Frances Ponsonby (daughter of John Ponsonby).

Career
He replaced his older brother, William, as Member of Parliament (MP) for North Derbyshire when the latter succeeded their grandfather as Earl of Burlington. Cavendish would retain the seat until his death in 1880.

He raised the 9th (High Peak Rifles of Bakewell) Derbyshire Rifle Volunteer Corps on 28 February 1860 during the enthusiasm for the Volunteer movement. This later became part of the 3rd Administrative Battalion of Derbyshire Volunteers under his command. He retired and became Honorary Colonel of the unit in 1867. It was later commanded by his son, James Charles Cavendish.

Personal life
On 4 July 1835, he was married to Lady Louisa Lascelles, a daughter of Henry Lascelles, 2nd Earl of Harewood and Henrietta Sebright (a daughter of Lt.-Gen. Sir John Sebright, 6th Baronet). Together, they were the parents of six children:

 Henry George Cavendish (1836–1865), who died unmarried.
 Alice Louisa Cavendish (1837–1905), who married the Hon. Algernon Egerton, the third son of Francis Egerton, 1st Earl of Ellesmere (a younger son of George Leveson-Gower, 1st Duke of Sutherland), in 1863.
 James Charles Cavendish (1838–1918), who died unmarried.
 Arthur Cavendish (1841–1858), who died unmarried.
 Walter Frederick Cavendish (1844–1866), who died unmarried.
 Susan Henrietta Cavendish (1846–1909), who married Henry Brand, 2nd Viscount Hampden, the Governor of New South Wales.

Lord George died at Ashford Hall, Derbyshire on 23 September 1880.

Ancestry

References

External links 
 
Lord George Henry Cavendish (1810-1880), Politician; MP for North Derbyshire at National Portrait Gallery, London

1810 births
1880 deaths
George
Members of the Parliament of the United Kingdom for English constituencies
Younger sons of dukes
UK MPs 1832–1835
UK MPs 1835–1837
UK MPs 1837–1841
UK MPs 1841–1847
UK MPs 1847–1852
UK MPs 1852–1857
UK MPs 1857–1859
UK MPs 1859–1865
UK MPs 1865–1868
UK MPs 1868–1874
UK MPs 1874–1880